

The Layzell Cricket is a single-seat autogyro produced in the United Kingdom for homebuilding, although it was first produced in the early 1970s fully factory-built. It was a typically minimalist design, featuring a pilot's seat semi-enclosed within a fairing, and a pusher engine and large tailfin located aft of the rotor mast. Forty-three of the original Crickets were built by Campbell Aircraft, with the type enjoying a brief revival in 2001 when it was marketed in kit form by Mike Concannon of Cricket Gyroplanes, before reaching production again in 2005 by Layzell Gyroplanes as the Mk.6.

The type remained in production by Layzell through 2011, although by July 2012 the company website had been removed from the internet.

Specifications (Mk.6)

References

External links

Layzell Gyroplanes website archives on Archive.org

1960s British sport aircraft
Single-engined pusher autogyros
Homebuilt aircraft
Layzell Gyroplanes
Aircraft first flown in 1969